Edward Davenport may refer to:

 Edward Davenport (fraudster) (born 1966), British convicted advance fee fraudster
 Edward Loomis Davenport (1816–1877), American actor
 Edward J. Davenport (1899–1953), Los Angeles City Council member
 Edward Davenport (Conservative politician) (1838–1874), British Member of the UK Parliament for St Ives
 Edward Davenport (MP for Coventry), Member of Parliament for Coventry
 Edward Davenport (cricketer), English cricketer, clergyman and educator